The Blood is a 1922 German silent film directed by Paul Legband.

Cast

References

Bibliography

External links

1922 films
Films of the Weimar Republic
German silent feature films
Films directed by Paul Legband
German black-and-white films
1920s German films